The teams of Group A were announced on 11 February 2017. Group B teams were announced a day later.

Group A

New Caledonia
Coach:  Michel Clarque

Papua New Guinea

Coach:  Harrison Kamake

Tahiti

Coach:  Patrice Flaccadori

Vanuatu
Coach:  Rocky Neveserveth

Group B

Fiji
Coach:  Shalen Lal

New Zealand
Coach:  Danny Hay

Samoa
Coach:  Desmond Faaiuaso

Solomon Islands
Coach:   Marlon Houkarawa

References 

2017 OFC U-17 Championship